Chandrima Uddan or Chandrima Udyan (Chandrimā "moon" Udyān "park") is a park situated across the road of the national parliament house, in Dhaka, Bangladesh.

The park is notable for being the place where the former Bangladeshi President, Ziaur Rahman was buried. It is connected to the road with a bridge which runs over the Crescent Lake (from which the park derives its original name). According to a 2014 Dhaka Tribune article, "Illegal establishments, drug addicts, hookers, muggers and petty criminals have robbed the park of most of its beauty."

Gallery

References

Parks in Dhaka
Tombs in Bangladesh